Va Bene is an Italian expression meaning "all right". It may refer to:

Va Bene (yacht), a luxury yacht designed by Richard Hein and built in 1992 by Kees Cornelissen
"Va bene" (song), 2014 multilingual song by La Fouine featuring singer Reda Taliani
"Va Bene", 2018 song by L'Algérino

Also see
Va bene, va bene così, 1984 live album of Italian singer Vasco Rossi
Anche libero va bene, original Italian title of Along the Ridge, a 2006 Italian film directed by Kim Rossi Stuart